Yelena Tissina (born February 10, 1977) is a Russian sprint canoer who competed in the late 1990s and early 2000s. She won two bronze medals at the ICF Canoe Sprint World Championships with one in 1997 (K-2 200 m) and one in 1998 (K-4 200 m).

Tissina also competed at the 2000 Summer Olympics in Sydney, finishing seventh in the K-4 500 m event and ninth in the K-2 500 m event.

References

Sports-reference.com profile

1977 births
Canoeists at the 2000 Summer Olympics
Living people
Olympic canoeists of Russia
Russian female canoeists
ICF Canoe Sprint World Championships medalists in kayak